Édouard Ouellette (November 6, 1860 – February 2, 1931) was a Canadian provincial politician. He was a member of the Legislative Assembly of Quebec for Yamaska from 1905 to 1923 and a member of the Legislative Council of Quebec from 1923 until his death in 1931.

References

1860 births
1931 deaths
Quebec Liberal Party MLCs
Quebec Liberal Party MNAs
Burials at Notre Dame des Neiges Cemetery